Charles John Buelow  (January 12, 1877 – May 4, 1951) was an American Major League Baseball infielder for the New York Giants in 1901.

External links

1877 births
1951 deaths
New York Giants (NL) players
Major League Baseball third basemen
Baseball players from Iowa
Minor league baseball managers
Rockford Rough Riders players
Columbus Buckeyes (minor league) players
Columbus Senators players
Grand Rapids Furnituremakers players
Cleveland Lake Shores players
Rockford Red Sox players
Dubuque Shamrocks players
Peoria Distillers players
Clinton Infants players
Dubuque Dubs players